Klaus Löwitsch (8 April 1936 – 3 December 2002) was a German actor, best known in Germany for his starring role in the television detective series Peter Strohm.

He appeared in several films directed by Rainer Werner Fassbinder, beginning with Pioneers in Ingolstadt (1971) and notably including World on a Wire (1973) and The Marriage of Maria Braun (1979).

His English language films include Cross of Iron (1977), The Odessa File (1974), Firefox (1982) and Fassbinder's Despair (1978).

He was born in Berlin. He died in Munich from pancreatic cancer.

Filmography

External links and references

Klaus Löwitsch at Allmovie

1936 births
2002 deaths
Deaths from cancer in Germany
Deaths from pancreatic cancer
German male film actors
German male television actors
20th-century German male actors
21st-century German male actors
Burials at the Ostfriedhof (Munich)
German Film Award winners